George Daniel Galamaz (born 5 April 1981 in București) is a former Romanian football defender (sweeper/centre-back).

Career
In 2009–2010 season, he was selected the central defender of the Year.

He played for Unirea Urziceni. On 31 August 2010, he signed a contract with Steaua București, together with his former teammates from Ricardo, Marinescu, Apostol, Bilaşco and Onofraş: the following week, Brandán also signed.

On 30 October 2011, a Romanian football spectator hit Galamaz after running past security on to the pitch during an away game with Petrolul Ploiești. Galamaz was later diagnosed with a broken right cheekbone.

International career

International stats

Honours

Sportul Studențesc
Divizia B: 2000–01

Dinamo București
Romanian Cup: 2004–05

Unirea Urziceni
Liga I: 2008–09

Steaua București
Romanian Cup: 2010–11

References

External links

1981 births
Living people
Footballers from Bucharest
Romanian footballers
Association football central defenders
Association football sweepers
FC Sportul Studențesc București players
FC Rapid București players
FC Dinamo București players
FC Unirea Urziceni players
FC Steaua București players
FC Universitatea Cluj players
FC Petrolul Ploiești players
Anorthosis Famagusta F.C. players
Liga I players
Cypriot First Division players
Romania international footballers
Romania under-21 international footballers
Romanian expatriate footballers
Expatriate footballers in Cyprus
Romanian expatriate sportspeople in Cyprus